The Legacy of Islamic Antisemitism: From Sacred Texts to Solemn History is a 2008 book by Andrew Bostom. It has been described in the Jerusalem Post as a “collection of sources, Islamic and others, which testify to the long and sorry history of anti-Semitism in Islam.”

Benny Morris writing in The New Republic calls Bostom's book "important and deeply discouraging."  Morris discusses a great deal of material that Bostom has omitted, concluding that in many ways the antisemitism of the Muslim world is even worse than portrayed in the Legacy of Islamic Antisemitism. However, Benny Morris later apologized in the review for this comment, saying "Mea culpa. I somehow missed the references to the Aden and Moroccan massacres and the medieval pogroms and apologize for writing that they were not mentioned in the book."

According to Hebrew University professor Raphael Israeli, “the author delves in considerable detail into the main sources of Islamic jurisprudence - the Koran and the Hadith, complemented by the Sirah (the earliest pious Muslim biographies of Muhammad), where an abundance of references, usually not complimentary but rather derogatory, are made to Jews, collectively known as Israi'liyyat (Israelites' stories). This is a trove of anti-Jewish stereotypes that have become the Shari'a-based uncontested "truth" about the People of the Book. Those accounts are invariably cited in sermons during Friday prayers, thus assuring their universal diffusion among Muslim constituents and the constant poisoning of the souls of young and adult Muslims alike, something that renders their fundamentally negative attitudes to Jews and Israel unchangeable.”

The Wisconsin Jewish Chronicle praises the book for making its case with exhaustive use of original sources, "Anti-Semitic passages from the Koran, the hadith (collected anecdotes about the Muslim prophet Mohammed’s life), the sira (early biographies of Mohammed).  Anti-Semitic essays, speeches and excerpted book passages by Muslim scholars, theologians and thinkers from the Middle Ages to the present. (and) Scholarly, witness and journalistic accounts of Muslim persecutions of and discrimination against Jews over more than 1,000 years."

See also
Islamic antisemitism
Anti-Zionism

References

Islam and Judaism
Islam and antisemitism
2008 non-fiction books
Books about the Middle East
Books critical of Islam
2008 in Islam